Abigroup was an Australian construction company.

History
Abigroup was established as Graham Evans & Co in 1957 as a civil engineering company within New South Wales, being renamed Abignano in 1961. In 1981 it was listed on the Australian Securities Exchange. In 1984 Abignano acquired Enacon followed in 1987 by Robert Salzer Constructions.

In 1988, Abignano was renamed Abigroup following a management buyout and building company Hughes Bros was acquired. In 2004, Abigroup was acquired by Bilfinger Berger. In December 2010 it was included in the sale of Bilfinger Berger Australia to Lendlease. The brand was retired in 2013 as part of a restructure of Lendlease's construction business units.

Major projects
Major projects undertaken included:

References

External links
Company website

Companies based in Sydney
Companies formerly listed on the Australian Securities Exchange
Construction and civil engineering companies established in 1957
Construction and civil engineering companies of Australia
Lendlease
2013 disestablishments in Australia
Australian companies established in 1957